Neptun Bajko (born 8 September 1948) is a former Albanian footballer and coach for Partizani Tirana and Albania.

Playing career
Bajko scored for Partizani in a controversial 1968–69 European Cup Winners' Cup first round loss away against Torino, a first post-war confrontation between an Italian and Albanian club side.

Honours
as a player
Kategoria Superiore: 1
 1971

as a coach
Kategoria Superiore: 1
 1987

References

1948 births
Living people
Footballers from Tirana
Albanian footballers
Association football defenders
FK Partizani Tirana players
Albanian football managers
Albania national football team managers
KF Teuta Durrës managers
FK Partizani Tirana managers
Besëlidhja Lezhë managers
FK Dinamo Tirana managers
Kategoria Superiore players
Kategoria Superiore managers